Schoenionta necydaloides is a species of beetle in the family Cerambycidae. It was described by Francis Polkinghorne Pascoe in 1867. It is known from Malaysia, Borneo and Sulawesi.

References

Saperdini
Beetles described in 1867